Breach of confidence in English law is an equitable doctrine that allows a person to claim a remedy when their confidence has been breached. A duty of confidence arises when confidential information comes to the knowledge of a person in circumstances in which it would be unfair if it were disclosed to others. Breach of confidence gives rise to a civil claim. The Human Rights Act 1998 has developed the law on breach of confidence so that it now applies to private bodies as well as public ones.

Elements
There are several elements required to prove a breach of confidence, and these are not set out in specific legislation. Typically, to rely on a claim of breach of confidence, reference must be made to the elements established in common law. In Coco v A N Clark (Engineers) Ltd a breach of confidence claim was made regarding technical information which held significant commercial value.

Here, the three elements required to establish such a claim were established.

The information is confidential 
The information at hand must have a clearly identifiable nature of confidentiality. Confidential information typically has some sort of value, be it financial or otherwise, the information is somehow of significance that it warrants protection. Secrecy can also indicate confidentiality. However, a document or conversation signalled or marked as one that is secret or confidential may not necessarily impart confidentiality.

Accessibility 
The information must be sufficiently secret, not common or public knowledge. A number of considerations have been regarded by courts as relevant to whether information is public knowledge, and in determining confidentiality accessibility is seen as an important factor. In the High Court of Australia case of ABC v Lenah (Lenah), the operator of a Tasmanian abattoir operator had obtained an injunction to prevent the Australian Broadcasting Corporation (ABC) from publishing footage taken on private property, with the ABC appealing this injunction . The abattoir operator argued in part that the film taken on his private property of slaughtering methods was private and confidential, hence subject to a breach of confidentiality claim. Justice Kirby alone accepted submissions that the publication of information obtained through trespass was restrainable as a result of breaching confidential information. However, this was a dissenting argument, with the Court majority (Justice Gummow, Justice Hayne, Justice Gaudron) finding that an act is not private merely because it takes place on private property, and that the act itself must be private and confidential in nature. Lenah demonstrated that where someone could stumble upon the confidential information or it is available, confidentiality is unlikely to be imported. The abattoir had been inspected regularly, and with the ease of public access to the private property, this meant the information was generally accessibly and in the public domain.

Circle of confidence 
A duty of confidentiality can be imposed on those told confidential information, and a select group of people being informed of information does not vitiate confidentiality. In contrast to Lenah, Jane Doe v ABC (Doe) found information obtained by the broadcaster to be confidential. A woman had been sexually assaulted, with the broadcaster obtaining knowledge of this information from the remarks of the trial judge. Legislation banned publishing of details likely to 'identify a person against whom a sexual offence is alleged to have been committed. The effect of such legislation gave the information a private character. Justice Hample found that the nature of the information, the circumstances whereby the broadcaster became aware of this information, and the effect of the legislation each created an obligation of confidence but that in combination all three created "powerful circumstances importing an obligation of confidence". So, a breach of confidence was established. English courts had been establishing a need for reform some years prior to Lenah. In Campbell v MGM Ltd, the House of Lords refuted the previous requisite for a pre-existing arrangement of trust and confidence, instead holding an obligation arises whenever a person receives information they know or ought reasonably to have known is confidential. The Court in Lenah applied these English developments, finding confidence in this case was not impacted merely because the woman at hand had informed friends and family she had been sexually assaulted. In such circumstances, a duty of confidentiality had been imposed, and disclosure in such a manner did not vitiate the confidentiality of information allowing others to breach such confidentiality.

Value 
The breach of confidence doctrine does not protect trivial information. The information will warrant the protection by courts through equity only if such courts can objectively assess the information as valuable. Typically, information that holds commercial value will easily satisfy this element, as equity seeks to protect secrets that arise from the 'ingenuity of the human brain', and most often such secrets will hold some sort of commercial value.

The information was shared in a confidential manner 
It is not sufficient for the information to be confident. This information must also have been communicated to its recipient in circumstances that can be properly described as confidential. In Mense v Milenkovic, McInerney J said:

So, the circumstances in which the information was shared can aid in determining the existence and scope of any obligation of confidence. Specifically, what the recipient knew and also what they ought to have known in the circumstances is relevant.

There are four ways of receiving confidential information:

 Impaired in contec

The information was used to detriment of its owner

History
The modern English law of confidence stems from the judgment of the Lord Chancellor, Lord Cottenham, in which he restrained the defendant from publishing a catalogue of private etchings made by Queen Victoria and Prince Albert (see Prince Albert v Strange).

However, the jurisprudential basis of confidentiality remained largely unexamined until the case of Saltman Engineering Co. Ltd. v Campbell Engineering Co. Ltd., in which the Court of Appeal upheld the existence of an equitable doctrine of confidence, independent of contract.

In Attorney-General v Observer Ltd (1990) – the Spycatcher case – Lord Goff of Chieveley identified three limitations to the doctrine:

Contemporary application 
Article 8 of the European Convention on Human Rights was incorporated into English domestic law by the  Human Rights Act 1998. Article 8 provides that everyone has the right to respect for his private and family life, his home and his correspondence. In Campbell v MGN Ltd, the House of Lords held that the Daily Mirror had breached Naomi Campbell’s confidentiality rights by publishing reports and pictures of her attendance at Narcotics Anonymous meetings.

Although the court divided 3–2 as to the result of the appeal and adopted slightly different formulations of the applicable principles, there was broad agreement that, in confidentiality cases involving issues of privacy, the focus shifted from the nature of the relationship between claimant and defendant to (a) an examination of the nature of the information itself and (b) a balancing exercise between the claimant's rights under Article 8 and the defendant's competing rights (for example, under Article 10, to free speech).

Other cases
 Lennon v News Group Newspapers Ltd (1978) FSR 573
 
 
 
 
 R v Department of Health; Ex parte Source Informatics Ltd [2000] 1 All ER 786
 Attorney General v Observer and Guardian Newspapers Ltd [2011] UKSC 39

See also
Privacy in English law

References

Further reading
 

English law
English privacy law